Khalil Bin Ebrahim Hassan is a Bahraini surgeon and diplomat who has been the first Ambassador of the Kingdom of Bahrain to Japan (since 2005) and was also the country's health minister.

Biography 
Khalil Bin Ebrahim Hassan graduated from Damascus University Medical School in 1972. Throughout the rest of the decade he worked in the United Kingdom before returning to Bahrain and working there in several hospitals during the 1980s. During the 1990s, Hassan was a professor in a university before being appointed minister of health of Bahrain in 2002. He was appointed the kingdom's ambassador to Japan in 2005, when Bahrain first opened an embassy in the country.

Personal life 
He is married and has two daughters and three sons. His hobbies include golf, photography, tennis, squash, swimming, traveling.

References 

Ambassadors of Bahrain to Japan
Bahraini diplomats
Bahraini surgeons
Damascus University alumni
Living people
Year of birth missing (living people)